Chronos is a 1985 abstract film directed by Ron Fricke, created with custom-built time-lapse cameras. Originally released in IMAX theaters, it is now available on DVD, Blu-ray and HD DVD.

Synopsis
Chronos is 42 minutes long and has no actors or dialogue. The soundtrack consists of a single continuous piece by composer Michael Stearns. Filmed in dozens of locations on five continents, the film relates to the concept of time passing on different scales—the bulk of the film covers the history of civilization, from pre-history to Egypt to Rome to Late Antiquity to the rise of Western Europe in the Middle Ages to the Renaissance to the modern era. It centers on European themes but not exclusively. Other time scales include the passing of seasons, and the passing of night and day, and the passing shadows of the sun in an afternoon to the passing of people on the street. These themes are intermingled with symbolic meaning.

Background
Chronos shares its particular style with the film Koyaanisqatsi (1983), for which Ron Fricke was the cinematographer, as well as his later films Sacred Site and Baraka (1992). The theme of the film is "the celebration of life", and does not include the themes of technology as the culprit for society or "life out of balance", which were present in Koyaanisqatsi. American Cinematographer described the film as "a musical poem praising the evolution of Western man from Cairo to Los Angeles." The film was produced by Canticle Films, a production company founded by Fricke. Funding for Chronos came from the seed money acquired through the publicity surrounding the production of Koyaanisqatsi.

Fricke designed and built a 65 mm camera for the film, which included a motion control system for the film's cinematography. The director also used the system in his later films.

Michael Stearns, while composing the soundtrack for the film, used a custom-made instrument called "The Beam" to generate many of the sounds he required.

The name of the film comes from the Ancient Greek word χρόνος, krònos, which means time and is also the source to many modern terms related to time, such as chronology, synchronous etc.

Awards
 International OMNI-MAX Film Festival: "Grand Prize Winner"

References

External links
 
 
 

IMAX short films
IMAX documentary films
American avant-garde and experimental films
Films directed by Ron Fricke
1985 short films
1985 films
Non-narrative films
Films scored by Michael Stearns
1980s avant-garde and experimental films
Films about time
American short films
1980s American films